Fabio Ravezzani, also known as Direttore (Milan, Italy, February 24, 1960) is an Italian sports journalist and TV presenter of Qui studio a voi stadio.

References

1960 births
Italian sports journalists
Italian male journalists
Mass media people from Milan
Living people